Little French Songs is the fourth studio album by Italian-French singer Carla Bruni. It was recorded during 2012 and released on 29 March 2013 on Teorema and Barclay in France, and on 16 April 2013 in United Kingdom on Verve.

Track listing 
"J'arrive à toi" (3:04)
"Chez Keith et Anita" (3:00)
"Prière" (3:26)
"Mon Raymond" (3:10)
"Dolce Francia" (3:55)
"Pas une dame" (2:57)
"Darling" (3:21)
"La valse posthume" (short version) (2:27)
"Little French Song" (2:55)
"Liberté" (3:38)
"Le pingouin" (2:18)

Deluxe edition
A deluxe edition was released containing two additional bonus tracks, titled "Le blonde Exquise" and "Luna", as well as a longer version of the track "La valse posthume". The deluxe edition also includes a Blu-ray pure audio version of the tracks and a DVD containing an acoustic live session of Bruni.

"J'arrive à toi" (3:05)
"Mon Raymond" (3:10)
"Prière" (3:25)
"Pas une dame" (2:57)
"Dolce Francia" (3:55)
"Chez Keith et Anita" (2:59)
"Darling" (3:21)
"La valse posthume" (long track) (3:19)
"La blonde exquise" [bonus track] (3:08)
"Liberté" (3:37)
"Little French Song" (2:55)
"Lune [Bonus]" (3:12)
"Le pingouin" (2:18)

Personnel 
Credits for Little French Songs adapted from liner notes.

 Carla Bruni – vocals
 Dominique Blanc-Francard – mastering
 Richard Dumas – photography
 Bénédicte Schmitt – engineering, mixing, production
 Jérôme Witz – artwork

Charts

Weekly charts

Year-end charts

Certifications

References 

2013 albums
Barclay (record label) albums
Carla Bruni albums
French-language albums